The General Council of the Assemblies of God, Nigeria is a Pentecostal Christian denomination in Nigeria. It is affiliated with the World Assemblies of God Fellowship. The headquarters in Opkoto, Ebonyi State. In November 2022, Rev. (Dr.) Abel Amadi was elected the General Superintendent of Assemblies of God, Nigeria.

History
The General Council of the Assemblies of God Nigeria has its origins in the Nigerian Church of Jesus Christ and a partnership with the Assemblies of God USA in 1934. The council was founded in 1964. In 2019, it had 16,300 churches and 3.6 million members.

References

External links
 Official Website

Christian denominations in Nigeria
Nigeria
Pentecostal denominations in Africa